The 2016–17 National League season, known as the Vanarama National League for sponsorship reasons, was the second season under the new title of National League, thirteenth season consisting of three divisions and the thirty-eighth season overall. 

The National League covers the top two levels of non-League football in England. The National League is the fifth highest level of the overall pyramid, while the National League North and National League South exist at the sixth level. The top team and the winner of the play-off of the Premier division will be promoted to League Two, while the bottom four are relegated to the North or South divisions. The champions of the North and South divisions will be promoted to the Premier division, alongside the play-off winners from each division. The bottom three in each of the North and South divisions are relegated to the premier divisions of the Northern Premier League, Isthmian League or Southern League. The fixtures were announced on 6 July 2016.

National League

Promotion and relegation
The following teams changed divisions after the 2015–16 season. Solihull Moors were the first team to be promoted 
after North Ferriby United's 2–0 loss to Stalybridge Celtic on 13 April 2016 clinched them the National League North title. This will be their first season in the National League. Sutton United were promoted on 23 April 2016 after a 2–0 win over Chelmsford City, returning to the league for the first time in sixteen years. 

Dagenham & Redbridge were relegated from League Two on 16 April 2016 after their 3–2 loss to Leyton Orient returning to the fifth tier after nine years in the Football League. York City were relegated on 23 April after their 3–0 loss to Accrington Stanley, returning to the league for the first time since the 2011–12 season. North Ferriby United's 2–1 win over AFC Fylde and Maidstone United's win on penalties over Ebbsfleet United made them the National League North and National League South play-off winners respectively. It is the first time both teams have competed in the league.

The six teams replace Cheltenham Town, Grimsby Town, FC Halifax Town, Altrincham, Kidderminster Harriers and Welling United. Cheltenham Town were promoted back to League Two at their first attempt after beating FC Halifax Town 2–0 on 16 April 2016. Grimsby Town were promoted back to the Football League after beating Forest Green Rovers 3–1 in the 2015–16 National League play-off final. Kidderminster Harriers and Welling United were relegated on the same day after defeats to Barrow and Chester. 

On the final day of the season, Altrincham were relegated after losing 3–0 to Braintree Town, ending their two-year stay in the league. FC Halifax Town's 1–1 draw against Macclesfield Town was not enough to save them after Guiseley's 4–3 win over Torquay United, ending their three-year stay in the league.

Team changes

To National League
Promoted from 2015–16 National League North
 Solihull Moors
 North Ferriby United

Promoted from 2015–16 National League South
 Sutton United
 Maidstone United

Relegated from 2015–16 League Two
 Dagenham & Redbridge
 York City

From National League
Relegated to 2016–17 National League North
 FC Halifax Town
 Altrincham
 Kidderminster Harriers

Relegated to 2016–17 National League South
 Welling United

Promoted to 2016–17 League Two
 Cheltenham Town
 Grimsby Town

Stadia and locations

Managerial changes

League table

Results

Play-offs

First leg

Second leg

Final

Top scorers

National League North

Team changes

To National League North
Promoted from 2015–16 Northern Premier League Premier Division
 Darlington 1883
 Salford City

Relegated from 2015–16 National League
 FC Halifax Town
 Altrincham
 Kidderminster Harriers

From National League North
Relegated to 2016–17 Northern Premier League Premier Division
 Corby Town
 Hednesford Town

Relegated to 2016–17 Isthmian League Premier Division
 Lowestoft Town

Promoted to 2016–17 National League
 Solihull Moors
 North Ferriby United

Stadia and locations

League table

Results

Play-offs

First leg

Second leg

Final

Top scorers

National League South

Team changes

To National League South
Promoted from 2015–16 Isthmian League Premier Division
 Hampton & Richmond Borough
 East Thurrock United

Promoted from 2015–16 Southern League Premier Division
 Poole Town
 Hungerford Town

Relegated from 2015–16 National League
 Welling United

From National League South
Relegated to 2016–17 Isthmian League Premier Division
 Havant & Waterlooville

Relegated to 2016–17 Southern League Premier Division
 Hayes & Yeading United
 Basingstoke Town

Promoted to 2016–17 National League
 Sutton United
 Maidstone United

Stadia and locations

League table

Results

Play-offs

First leg

Second leg

Final

Top scorers

References

 
National League (English football) seasons
5
Eng